The Cooper T61 (Type 61), also known as the Cooper T61 Monaco, or the Cooper Monaco T61, is a sports racing car, designed, developed and built by British manufacturer Cooper, in 1961. It is the successor and evolution of the T57. Its motor racing career spanned 6 years (1962-1966, 1968); where it won a total of 16 races (plus 2 additional class wins), achieved 23 podium finishes, and clinched 3 pole positions. It was powered by a number of different engines, including a Coventry Climax four-cylinder engine, a Maserati V8 engine, a Ford FE engine, and a Chevrolet small-block engine.

References

Cooper racing cars
Sports racing cars
1960s cars
Cars of England